François Fug (born 7 February 1931) is a Luxembourgian former sports shooter. He competed in the 50 metre pistol event at the 1960 Summer Olympics.

References

1931 births
Living people
Luxembourgian male sport shooters
Olympic shooters of Luxembourg
Shooters at the 1960 Summer Olympics
Sportspeople from Esch-sur-Alzette